The 2001 Speedway Grand Prix of Great Britain was the second race of the 2001 Speedway Grand Prix season. It took place on 9 June in the Millennium Stadium in Cardiff, Wales

Starting positions draw 
The Speedway Grand Prix Commission nominated Martin Dugard and Scott Nicholls as Wild Card. Injured Joe Screen and Peter Karlsson were replaced by Henrik Gustafsson and Grzegorz Walasek.

Heat details

Standings

See also 
 Speedway Grand Prix
 List of Speedway Grand Prix riders

References

External links 
 FIM-live.com
 SpeedwayWorld.tv

Great Britain
2001
Speedway Grand Prix of Great Britain 2001
2001 in British motorsport
2001 in Welsh sport
2000s in Cardiff
June 2001 sports events in the United Kingdom